Dauphin (plural dauphins) may refer to:

Noble and royal title
 Dauphin of Auvergne
 Dauphin of France, heir apparent to the French crown
 Dauphin of Viennois

People
 Dauphin (surname)

Places

Manitoba, Canada
 Dauphin (provincial electoral district)
 Dauphin, Manitoba
 Dauphin Lake
 Dauphin River
 Rural Municipality of Dauphin

United States
 Dauphin, Pennsylvania, United States
 Dauphin, Texas, United States
 Dauphin County, Pennsylvania, United States
 Dauphin Island, Alabama, United States

Elsewhere
 Dauphin, Alpes-de-Haute-Provence, France
 Dauphin Quarter, Saint Lucia
 Dauphin River (Saint Lucia)

Vehicles
 Dauphin (rocket), a French sounding rocket
 Eurocopter AS365 Dauphin, a European-made helicopter series
 Le Dauphin, defunct French car manufacturer

Ships and boats
 USS Dauphin (APA-97),  a Windsor-class attack transport in the U.S. Navy during World War II
 Dauphin, a French submarine seized by Italy during World War II to be converted into a cargo submarine
 Dauphin, a Nantucket whaleship that in 1821 rescued the captain and another crewman from a whaleboat of the sunken Essex whaleship

Other uses
 Dauphin railway station
 Dauphin Regional Airport
 Dauphin, a cheese, see Maroilles
 "The Dauphin" (Star Trek: The Next Generation), an episode of Star Trek: The Next Generation

See also
 CCGS Cape Dauphin, a Canadian Coast Guard motor lifeboat
 Central Dauphin (disambiguation)
 Fort Dauphin (disambiguation)
 Dauphine (disambiguation), the female equivalent
 Dauphiné